Lamb, hogget, and mutton, generically sheep meat, are the meat of domestic sheep, Ovis aries. A sheep in its first year is a lamb and its meat is also lamb. The meat from sheep in their second year is hogget. Older sheep meat is mutton. Generally, "hogget" and "sheep meat" are not used by consumers outside Norway, New Zealand, South Africa, Scotland, and Australia. Hogget has become more common in England, particularly in the North (Lancashire and Yorkshire) often in association with rare breed and organic farming.

In South Asian and Caribbean cuisine, "mutton" often means goat meat. At various times and places, "mutton" or "goat mutton" has occasionally been used to mean goat meat.

Lamb is the most expensive of the three types and in recent decades sheep meat is increasingly only retailed as "lamb", sometimes stretching the accepted distinctions given above. The stronger-tasting mutton is now hard to find in many areas, despite the efforts of the Mutton Renaissance Campaign in the UK. In Australia, the term prime lamb is often used to refer to lambs raised for meat. Other languages, such as French, Spanish, Italian, and Arabic, make similar or even more detailed distinctions among sheep meats by age and sometimes by sex and diet—for example, lechazo in Spanish refers to meat from milk-fed (unweaned) lambs.

Classifications and nomenclature 

The definitions for lamb, hogget and mutton vary considerably between countries. Younger lambs are smaller and more tender. Mutton is meat from a sheep over two years old, and has less tender flesh. In general, the darker the colour, the older the animal.

Britain, Australia, and New Zealand 
 Lamb — a young sheep which is less than one year old. From 1 July 2019, the Australian definition is "an ovine animal that: (a) is under 12 months of age; or (b) does not have any permanent incisor teeth in wear. This new definition meant that Australians farmers could extend the term "lamb" with another month. This followed a similar definition change in New Zealand in 2018. In Britain the definition is still "0 permanent incisor teeth". A permanent incisor tooth is said to be "in wear" if it protrudes further than the nearest milk teeth.
 Hogget — A term for a sheep of either sex having no more than two permanent incisors in wear, or its meat. In the UK, it means animals that are 11 to 24 months old, while Australian butchers use the term for animals that are 13 to 24 months old. Still common in farming usage and among speciality butchers, it is now a rare term in British, Australian and New Zealand supermarkets, where meat of all sheep less than two years old tends to be called "lamb".
 Mutton — the meat of a female (ewe) or castrated male (wether) sheep having more than two permanent incisors in wear.

United States 
In the early 1900s, mutton was widely consumed in the United States, but mutton consumption has declined since World War II. , most sheep meat in the United States comes from animals in between 12 and 14 months old, and is called "lamb"; the term "hogget" is not used. Federal statutes and regulations dealing with food labeling in the United States permit all sheep products to be marketed as "lamb." USDA grades for lamb are only partly a function of the animal's age. Animals up to 20 months old may meet the quality of the "USDA prime" grade depending on other factors, while "USDA choice" lamb can be of any age.
"Spring lamb" is defined by the USDA as having been slaughtered between March and October.

Indian subcontinent 

The term "mutton" is applied to goat meat in most countries on the Indian subcontinent, and the goat population has been rising. For example, mutton curry is always made from goat meat. It is estimated that over a third of the goat population is slaughtered every year and sold as mutton. The domestic sheep population in India and the Indian subcontinent has been in decline for over 40 years and has survived at marginal levels in mountainous regions, based on wild-sheep breeds, and mainly for wool production.

Other definitions 
 Milk-fed lamb — meat from an unweaned lamb, typically 4–6 weeks old and weighing 5.5–8 kg; this is almost unavailable in countries such as the United States and the United Kingdom. The flavour and texture of milk-fed lamb when grilled (such as the tiny lamb chops known as chuletillas in Spain) or roasted (lechazo asado or cordero lechal asado) is generally thought to be finer than that of older lamb, and fetches higher prices. The areas in northern Spain where this can be found include Asturias, Cantabria, Castile and León, and La Rioja.  Milk-fed lambs are especially prized for Easter in Greece, when they are roasted on a spit.
Young lamb — a milk-fed lamb between six and eight weeks old
Spring lamb — a milk-fed lamb, usually three to five months old, born in late winter or early spring and sold usually before 1 July (in the northern hemisphere).
Sucker lambs — a term used in Australia — includes young milk-fed lambs, as well as slightly older lambs up to about seven months of age which are also still dependent on their mothers for milk. Carcases from these lambs usually weigh between 14 and 30 kg. Older weaned lambs which have not yet matured to become mutton are known as old-season lambs.
Yearling lamb — a young sheep between 12 and 24 months old
Saltbush mutton – a term used in Australia for the meat of mature Merinos which have been allowed to graze on atriplex plants
Salt marsh lamb (also known as 'saltmarsh lamb' or by its French name, agneau de pré-salé) is the meat of sheep which graze on salt marsh in coastal estuaries that are washed by the tides and support a range of salt-tolerant grasses and herbs, such as samphire, sparta grass, sorrel and sea lavender. Depending on where the salt marsh is located, the nature of the plants may be subtly different. Salt marsh lamb has long been appreciated in France and is growing in popularity in the United Kingdom. Places where salt marsh lamb are reared in the UK include Harlech and the Gower Peninsula in Wales, the Somerset Levels, Morecambe Bay and the Solway Firth.
 Saltgrass lamb – a type of lamb exclusive to Flinders Island (Tasmania). The pastures on the island have a relatively high salt content, leading to a flavor and texture similar to saltmarsh lamb.

Butchery and cookery 

This meat generally is more tender than that from older sheep and appears more often on tables in some Western countries. Hogget and mutton have a stronger flavour than lamb because they contain a higher concentration of species-characteristic fatty acids and are preferred by some. Mutton and hogget also tend to be tougher than lamb (because of connective tissue maturation) and are therefore better suited to casserole-style cooking, as in Lancashire hotpot, for example.

Lamb is often sorted into three kinds of meat: forequarter, loin, and hindquarter. The forequarter includes the neck, shoulder, front legs, and the ribs up to the shoulder blade. The hindquarter includes the rear legs and hip. The loin includes the ribs between the two.

Lamb chops are cut from the rib, loin, and shoulder areas. The rib chops include a rib bone; the loin chops include only a chine bone. Shoulder chops are usually considered inferior to loin chops; both kinds of chops are usually grilled. Breast of lamb (baby chops) can be cooked in an oven.

Leg of lamb is a whole leg; saddle of lamb is the two loins with the hip. Leg and saddle are usually roasted, though the leg is sometimes boiled.

Forequarter meat of sheep, as of other mammals, includes more connective tissue than some other cuts, and, if not from a young lamb, is best cooked slowly using either a moist method, such as braising or stewing, or by slow roasting or American barbecuing. It is, in some countries, sold already chopped or diced.

Lamb shank definitions vary, but generally include:
 a cut from the arm of shoulder, containing leg bone and part of round shoulder bone, and covered by a thin layer of fat and fell (a thin, paper-like covering).
 a cut from the upper part of the leg.

Mutton barbeque is a tradition in Western Kentucky. The area was strong in the wool trade, which gave them plenty of older sheep that needed to be put to use.

Thin strips of fatty mutton can be cut into a substitute for bacon called macon.

Lamb tongue is popular in Middle Eastern cuisine both as a cold cut and in preparations like stews.

Cuts

UK, Canada, and other Commonwealth countries 

Approximate zones of the usual UK cuts of lamb:
 Scrag end (of neck)
 Middle neck
 Best End (of neck)
 Loin
 Chump (and chump chops)
 Leg (gigot in Scotland)
 Shank
 Shoulder
 Breast

US and Ireland 
Square cut shoulder – shoulder roast, shoulder chops and arm chops
Rack – rib chops and riblets, rib roast
Loin – loin chops or roast
Leg – sirloin chops, leg roast (leg of lamb)
Neck
Breast
Shanks (fore or hind)
Flank

New Zealand 

 Forequarter
 Neck – neck chops
 Shoulder – shoulder chops, shoulder roast (usually boned and rolled)
 Rib-eye
 Breast
 Knuckle
Loin
 Rib-loin – racks, frenched cutlets, spare ribs
 Mid-loin – striploin (backstrap), loin chops
Tenderloin
 Flap
 Full leg – leg roast (may be boned and rolled), leg chops. A short-cut leg is a full leg without the chump; a carvery leg is a short-cut leg without the thick flank
 Chump (rump) – chump chops, rump steak
 Thick flank (knuckle) – schnitzel
 Topside & silverside – steaks
 Shank

Production and consumption figures

Sheep meat consumption
According to the OECD-FAO Agricultural Outlook for 2016, the top consumers of sheep meat in 2015 were as follows: EU countries are not individually surveyed in this list. Among EU nations, Greece is the per capita leader in consumption at 12.3 kg, while the UK's annual per capita lamb consumption is 4.7 kg. Outside of the OECD, the largest per capita consumer overall is Mongolia, with 45.1 kg.

Sheep meat production 
The table below gives a sample of producing nations, but many other significant producers in the 50–120 kt range are not given.

Source: Helgi Library, World Bank, FAOSTAT

Dishes 

Meat from sheep features prominently in the cuisines of several Mediterranean cultures including Greece, Croatia, Turkey, North Africa, Jordan, and the Middle East, as well as in the cuisines of Pakistan and Afghanistan. In Greece, for example, it is an integral component of many meals and of religious feasts such as Easter, like avgolemono and magiritsa. It is also popular in the Basque culture, both in the Basque country of Europe and in the shepherding areas of the Western United States. In the United States, the Navajo have incorporated mutton and lamb into their traditional cuisine since the introduction of sheep by Spanish explorers and settlers in the 17th century, replacing wild turkey and venison and creating a pastoral culture. In Northern Europe, mutton and lamb feature in many traditional dishes, including those of Iceland, Norway and of the United Kingdom, particularly in the western and northern uplands, Scotland and Wales. Mutton used to be an important part of Hungarian cuisine due to strong pastoral traditions but began to be increasingly looked down on with the spread of urbanisation.

Mutton is also popular in Australia. Lamb and mutton are very popular in Central Asia and in certain parts of China, where other red meats may be eschewed for religious or economic reasons. Barbecued mutton is also a specialty in some areas of the United States (chiefly Owensboro, Kentucky) and Canada.

In Australia, the leg of lamb roast is considered to be the national dish. Commonly served on a Sunday or any other special occasion, it can be done in a kettle BBQ or a conventional oven. Typical preparation involves covering the leg of lamb with butter, pushing rosemary sprigs into incisions cut in the leg, and sprinkling rosemary leaves on top.

In Indonesia, lamb is popularly served as lamb satay and lamb curry. Both dishes are cooked with various spices from the islands, and served with either rice or lontong. A version of lamb and bamboo shoot curry is the specialty of Minang cuisine, although similar dishes can be found in Thai cuisine.

In Mexico, lamb is the meat of choice for barbacoa, in which the lamb is roasted or steamed wrapped in maguey leaves underground.

In Japan, although lamb is not traditionally consumed in most of the country, on the northern island of Hokkaido and in the northeastern Tohoku regions, a hot-pot dish called jingisukan (i.e. "Genghis Khan") is popular. In that dish, thin-sliced lamb is cooked over a convex skillet alongside various vegetables and mushrooms in front of the diners, then dipped in soy-sauce-based dipping sauces and eaten. It was so named because lamb is popular in Mongolia (see "Sheep meat consumption" above).

Organ meats/offal 

Lamb's liver, known as lamb's fry in New Zealand and Australia, is eaten in many countries. It is the most common form of offal eaten in the UK, traditionally used in the family favourite (and pub grub staple) of liver with onions, potentially also with bacon and mashed potatoes. It is a major ingredient, along with the lungs and heart (the pluck), in the traditional Scottish dish of haggis.

Lamb testicles or lamb fries are a delicacy in many parts of the world.
 
Lamb kidneys are found in many cuisines across Europe and the Middle East, often split into two halves and grilled (on kebabs in the Middle East), or sautéed in a sauce. They are generally the most highly regarded of all kidneys.

Lamb sweetbreads are a delicacy in many cuisines.

Environmental impact 

Production of lamb emits more greenhouse gas per gram of protein than other common foods, except for beef.

See also 

 Lechazo de Castilla y León – milk-fed lamb meat from Spain
 List of lamb dishes
 Mutton curry
 Mutton flaps
 Goat meat
 Sheep's trotters
 Smalahove – a Western Norwegian dish of sheep head

Bibliography 
 K.F. Warner, "Boning Lamb Cuts", Leaflet 74, U.S. Department of Agriculture, Bureau of Animal Industry, June 1931. full text
Bob Kennard, "Much ado about mutton". Ludlow: Merlin Unwin, 2014

Notes

External links 

 Sheep Meat Production

 
Meat by animal
Sheep